Ray Chen (born 6 March 1989) is a Taiwanese-Australian violinist. He was the first prize winner of the 2009 Queen Elisabeth Competition and the 2008 International Yehudi Menuhin Violin Competition.

Career
Born in Taipei, Taiwan, Chen began learning violin at the age of four. Within five years he completed all 10 levels of the Suzuki Music Education (Suzuki method) in Brisbane, Australia. Chen was invited to play solo with the Queensland Philharmonic Orchestra at the age of eight. He was also invited to perform at the opening celebration concert of the 1998 Winter Olympics in Nagano, Japan.

Chen was chosen as Australia's 4MBS's "Young Space Musician of the Year" in 1999. He was awarded the Sydney May Memorial Scholarship of the Australian Music Examinations Board (AMEB) for being the youngest and most talented musician. Chen was awarded his Licentiate Diploma of Music with distinction by the AMEB at age 11. At age 13, he won first prize in the Australian National Youth Concerto Competition (NYCC), and in 2005 won first prize in the 2005 Australia National Kendall Violin Competition. Professor Goetz Richter, chair of the String Unit at the Sydney Conservatorium of Music has described Chen as "one of the most talented and accomplished young violinists to have emerged from Australia." His violin teachers have included Kerry Smith and Professor Peter Zhang (Sydney Conservatorium). Chen graduated with a bachelor of music degree in violin performance under Aaron Rosand at the Curtis Institute of Music in Philadelphia.

In the summers of 2006 and 2007, Chen attended the Encore School for Strings, studying under David Cerone at the Cleveland Institute of Music. In 2008 he attended the Aspen Music Festival on a full tuition fellowship, studying with Cho-Liang Lin (Juilliard School) and Paul Kantor (Cleveland Institute of Music).

In April 2008 Chen won the senior division first prize of the Yehudi Menuhin International Competition for Young Violinists in Cardiff, Wales. (In 2004 he had won jointly the third prize of the junior division in that competition.) Chen then came to the attention of Maxim Vengerov, who served on the competition jury, and was engaged for performances including debuts with the Mariinsky Theatre Orchestra in Saint Petersburg and at the International Rostropovich Festival with the Azerbaijan State Symphony Orchestra in Baku, under the baton of Vengerov.

Following his success at the Menuhin Competition, Chen won the first prize of the 2009 Queen Elisabeth Competition in Brussels, Belgium, bringing him numerous concert engagements, a recording, and a three-year loan of the "Huggins" Stradivarius from the Nippon Music Foundation. He was the competition's youngest participant. As Grand Prize winner, he was immediately launched on a concert tour, performing with the Royal Flemish Philharmonic (DeFilharmonie) under Jaap van Zweden and Aldert Vermeulen, the National Orchestra of Belgium under Rumon Gamba, and the Luxembourg Philharmonic Orchestra under Emmanuel Krivine, as well as in recitals throughout Belgium.

Chen was signed by Sony Classical in 2010. He has recorded the César Franck Violin Sonata, the violin concertos of Pyotr Ilyich Tchaikovsky and Felix Mendelssohn, and more.

Chen won the Newcomer Award in the 2011 Echo Klassik Awards. He was invited to perform at the annual Nobel Prize Concert in 2012, playing Max Bruch's Violin Concerto in G minor with the Royal Stockholm Philharmonic Orchestra.

In April 2016, he was the youngest juror ever of the Yehudi Menuhin International Competition for Young Violinists in London, with Pamela Frank, Joji Hattori, Martin Engstroem, Ning Feng, Julia Fischer, Dong-Suk Kang, Tasmin Little and Jeremy Menuhin.

He was signed by Decca Classics in 2017.

In November 2020, he led the performance to open the Golden Horse Awards ceremony.

After the short-term loan of "Huggins", he was lent the 1715 "Joachim" Stradivarius from the Nippon Music Foundation until 2019. As of October 2019, he is the recipient of the 1735 "Samazeuilh" Stradivarius loaned by the Nippon Music Foundation.

On 12 September 2022, he announced that he had received the 1714 “Dolphin” Stradivarius, which was loaned by the Nippon Music Foundation for a year. This Stradivarius was played by the legendary violinist Jascha Heifetz.

Non-classical collaborations

On November 20, 2021, Sting's single "What Could Have Been", featuring Chen, was in the third act of the League of Legends animated series Arcane; this single was released the same day. They then opened The Game Awards 2021 with the song.

In 2022, Ray was one of the collaborators on Jay Chou's song and video, "Greatest Works of Art," which rose to number one in China and garnered over 500 million views on Weibo and other Chinese streaming services within 48 hours of release.

Entrepreneurship
Chen is frequently noted for his online presence, being one of the first classical musicians of his stature to embrace social media. He began making funny videos on his Facebook page in 2014, and soon began creating humorous content for his eponymous YouTube channel pertaining to violin playing, classical music, and being Ray Chen. The YouTube classical music comedy duo TwoSetViolin cite Chen as an influence in their decision to start doing comedy on their channel and Chen has guested on their channel numerous times. Chen continues to create content for Instagram and other social media platforms and hosts a Discord community as well.

In 2021, Chen launched an app with developer Rose Xi under the title Pocket Conservatory. Conceived as a community-building and practice motivation app for musicians, Pocket attracted 3,500 users immediately (with another 4,000 on the waitlist) in 117 countries. In 2022, Pocket rebranded as Tonic and continued to add users in preparation for a wider launch.

Chen has also designed a violin case for Gewa, is in a multi-year marketing partnership with clothing design house Armani and wrote a blog for Vogue Italia.

Discography

Albums

Awards and nominations

ARIA Music Awards
The ARIA Music Awards are presented annually from 1987 by the Australian Recording Industry Association (ARIA).

! 
|-
| 2018
| The Golden Age
| Best Classical Album
| 
|

Forbes 30 Under 30
In 2017, Chen was selected to be included in Forbes 30 Under 30 under the Entertainment and Sports category for Asia.

See also
 Taiwanese Australians

References

External links

Ray Chen, 2007 semi-finalist, Michael Hill International Violin Competition
Profile at Cami Music

Australian classical violinists
Male classical violinists
Living people
Aspen Music Festival and School alumni
Curtis Institute of Music alumni
Prize-winners of the Queen Elisabeth Competition
People from Brisbane
Musicians from Taipei
Taiwanese emigrants to Australia
21st-century classical violinists
21st-century Australian male musicians
21st-century Australian musicians
1989 births